The Oscar class, Soviet designations Project 949 Granit and Project 949A Antey (NATO reporting names Oscar I and Oscar II respectively), are a series of nuclear-powered cruise missile submarines designed in the Soviet Union for the Soviet Navy.  First built in the 1970s, six remain  in service with the Russian Navy. Two other vessels were slated to be modernized since at least 2017 as Project 949AM, to extend their service life and increase combat capabilities but it is unclear whether work continues as of 2023.

The Project 949 submarines were the largest cruise missile submarines in service until some  ballistic missile submarines were converted to carry cruise missiles in 2007. They are the fourth largest class of submarines in displacement and length. Only the Soviet , Russian  and American Ohio-class ballistic missile submarines are larger.

History
The first submarine of Project 949 was laid down in the mid-1970s and was commissioned in 1980. In 1982 an updated and larger version (Project 949A) replaced the earlier version. In total fourteen submarines were constructed. The Oscar class was designed to attack NATO carrier battle groups using long-range P-700 Granit (SS-N-19 "Shipwreck") anti-ship missiles and targeting data provided by the  satellite system (via the submarine's "Punch Bowl" antenna). In the financial problems that followed the fall of the Soviet Union the Oscar class was prioritized by the Russian Navy, and when many older submarine classes were retired the Oscar class remained active in both the Northern and Pacific Fleets.

Modernization
The Rubin Design Bureau started working on Project 949A modernization in 2011, with Zvezdochka and Zvezda shipyards to carry out modernization of the vessels. In September 2015, Russian Defence Minister Sergey Shoygu announced during his visit to Zvezda shipyard, that at least three Oscar-class submarines will undergo repair and modernization to extend their service life by 20 years. The upgraded submarines will be known as "Project 949AM", according to the Russian officials. Modernization cost was estimated at RUB12 billion (US$182 million) per submarine.

In September 2016, it was reported submarines K-132 Irkutsk and K-442 Chelyabinsk are currently being modernized to 949AM. According to the Deputy Prime Minister of Russia Yury Borisov, Russia's Pacific Fleet may get four modernized Oscar II-class submarines armed with Kalibr cruise missiles by 2021.

Versions

Project 949 Granit (Oscar I)

Two Project 949 Granit submarines were built at Severodvinsk between 1975 and 1982 and assigned to the Soviet Northern Fleet. K-525 was laid down in 1975 and K-206 was laid down in 1979. After the construction of the first two submarines, production continued with the improved project 949A Antey. Both submarines of the Project 949 were decommissioned in 1996 and scrapped in 2004.

Project 949A Antei (Oscar II)

Eleven Project 949A Antey submarines were completed at Severodvinsk, of which five were assigned to the Soviet Northern Fleet. At one stage it had been planned to develop a new fourth-generation follow-on to the Project 949A, but this plan was later dropped. The external differences between the two classes were that the 949A class is about  longer than its predecessor (approximately  rather than ), providing space and buoyancy for improved electronics and quieter propulsion.

Some sources speculate that the acoustic performance of the Oscar II class is superior to early  but inferior to the Akula II class as well as subsequent (4th generation) designs. It also has a larger fin, and its propellers have seven blades instead of four.

Like all post-World War II Soviet designs, they are of double hull construction. Similarly, like other Soviet submarine designs, Project 949 not only has a bridge open to the elements on top of the sail but, for use in inclement weather, there is an enclosed bridge forward and slightly below this station. A distinguishing mark is a slight bulge at the top of the fin. A large door on either side of the fin reaches this bulge. These are wider at the top than on the bottom, and are hinged on the bottom. The Federation of American Scientists reports that this submarine carries an emergency crew escape capsule; it is possible that these doors cover it. The VSK escape capsule can accommodate 110 people.

Project 949AM
Modernization of Project 949A submarines, first announced by the Russian Defence Ministry in 2011. As part of the modernization, submarines will have their 24 P-700 Granit anti-ship missiles replaced with up to 72 newer 3M-54 Kalibr or P-800 Oniks anti-ship cruise missiles. The upgrade requires no design changes to the hull as the new missiles will fit into the existing launchers outside the pressure hull. The modernized boats will also get upgraded Omnibus-M combat information and Simfoniya-3.2 navigation systems, as well as new fire-control system, communications, sonar, radar, and electronic intercept equipment. The modernization aims to bring the submarines up to the same technological level as Russia's next-generation Yasen-class nuclear-powered cruise missile submarines.

Belgorod, Project 09852 
 
In December 2012, construction began on a special purpose research and rescue submarine, designated Project 09852, and based on the incomplete Project 949A (Oscar II class) submarine Belgorod. The submarine is reportedly designed to carry both manned (e.g. Project 18511 midget submarine) as well as unmanned (e.g. Klavesin-1R) underwater vessels. However, while carrying smaller unmanned underwater vehicles (UUVs) would be possible as-is on an Oscar-class hull, the accommodation of a midget submarine such as Project 18511 Paltus or the even larger Project 10831 Losharik, would probably require a major hull extension in order to accommodate a docking compartment. For example, the length of the submarine BS-64 Podmoskovye was increased by  even though the SLBM missile compartment was completely removed.

Belgorod will be reportedly used as a carrier of the rumored Poseidon (NATO reporting name Kanyon) nuclear-powered, thermonuclear armed unmanned underwater device capable to carry a 100 Mt thermonuclear warhead, with at least four such devices being carried horizontally in place of the 24 P-700 Granit (SS-N-19 Shipwreck) launchers for a total yield of 600 megatonnes of TNT.

On 23 April 2019, Belgorod was floated out of a slipway during a ceremony at the Sevmash shipyard, watched by the President of Russia Vladimir Putin via a TV-link. Further work was to be completed afloat and the submarine was scheduled to start its factory and state trials in 2020 after which it was to be delivered to the Russian Navy. However, this schedule was delayed with sea trials then projected to begin in May 2021. After some delays, sea trials were reported to have started on June 25, 2021. The submarine was delivered to the Russian Navy on 8 July 2022.

Units

Gallery

See also
 List of submarine classes in service

References

Bibliography
The Encyclopedia Of Warships, From World War Two To The Present Day, General Editor Robert Jackson.

Further reading

External links
 
 
 
 Line drawing of Oscar-class submarine

Submarine classes
 
Russian and Soviet navy submarine classes
Nuclear submarines of the Soviet Navy